Chain O'Lakes State Park can refer to either of two state parks in the United States:

Chain O'Lakes State Park (Illinois)
Chain O'Lakes State Park (Indiana)